Temür Malik, also spelled Timur-Malik, the son of Urus Khan, was the ninth Khan of the White Horde. Early during his reign, he successfully invaded the lands of his cousin Toqtamysh. However, Toqtamysh later managed to trap and kill Timur-Malik near Qara-Tal (on the shore of the Aral Sea), and succeeded him.

Family
Timur Malik was a son of Urus Khan, and brother of Qutlugh Buga and Toqtaqiya. He had two sons, Shadi Beg and Temür-Quthlug, both of whom became Khans of the Golden Horde. The latter of these was the khan who finally defeated Toqtamysh.

Genealogy
Genghis Khan
Jochi
Orda Khan
Sartaqtay
Köchü
Bayan
Sasibuqa
Ilbasan
Chimtay
Urus
Temur-Malik

See also
List of Khans of the Golden Horde

References

 

1378 deaths
14th-century monarchs in Asia
Year of birth unknown
Monarchs killed in action
Khans of the White Horde